M. brasiliensis  may refer to:
 Maclura brasiliensis, a plant species
 Mawsonia brasiliensis, an extinct fish species

See also